Parliament is a station on the Confederation Line as part of the O-Train network in Ottawa, Ontario, Canada. The station is located under O'Connor and Queen Streets in Downtown Ottawa. It has the highest projected use of all new stops on the Confederation Line, with access to Parliament Hill, Sparks Street, the downtown business district, as well as the World Exchange Plaza and Bank Street. The station is also near the CBC Ottawa Production Centre studios.

Layout

Parliament is an underground station with two side platforms. A single Grand Hall Concourse is located immediately above platform level. The station's entrances are integrated with the Sun Life Financial Centre and Heritage Place; both lead to the centre of the concourse, with ticket barriers at either end leading to the ends of the platform.

The Grand Hall Concourse is 15 metres underground, while the platform itself is 19 metres.

The station features two artworks: Lone Pine Sunset by Douglas Coupland, an installation of brightly coloured panels based on Tom Thomson's The Jack Pine running along the ceiling of the concourse, as well as Trails: home and away by Jennifer Stead, a series of painted metal screens located between the two tracks at platform level.

Service

The following routes serve Parliament station as of October 6, 2019:

References

Confederation Line stations
Railway stations located underground in Canada
Railway stations in Canada opened in 2019
2019 establishments in Ontario